The 1964 United States presidential election in Arizona took place on November 3, 1964, as part of the 1964 United States presidential election, which was held throughout all 50 states and D.C. Voters chose five representatives, or electors to the Electoral College, who voted for president and vice president.

Amidst a national landslide for incumbent Democratic President Lyndon B. Johnson, Arizona was one of only six states carried by Republican native son and U.S Senator Barry Goldwater, the only such state outside of the Deep South, and the sole state to be won by the Republican nominee in both 1960 and 1964. Goldwater carried Arizona by a slim margin of 1.00%, or less than 5,000 votes, the smallest margin of any state. Arizona weighed in this election as 23 points more Republican than the nation at large.

Key to Goldwater’s victory was Maricopa County, the state’s most populous county, which he carried by over 21,000 votes, despite Johnson carrying 10 out of 14 counties and two out of three congressional districts. , this is the last time that Graham, Mohave, and Yuma Counties have supported a Democratic presidential candidate. This marked the first time that Mohave County voted for the statewide loser. 

Since gaining statehood in 1912, Arizona had been considered a bellwether state in elections. The preceding 1960 presidential election was the first ever in which the Grand Canyon state did not back the national winner. This election, however, solidified Arizona’s transition from swing state to a Republican stronghold. From 1952 to 1992, Arizona would vote for the Republican candidate in every presidential election (in most cases by a much larger margin than Goldwater’s), giving it the longest Republican voting streak in the nation. Democrats Bill Clinton in 1996 and Joe Biden in 2020 would go on to narrowly carry the state with pluralities, but Arizona continues to this day to lean Republican relative to the nation. The last Democrat to win a majority of the state's vote was Harry S. Truman in 1948, thus making Arizona the only state in which no Democrat has won a majority of the vote in or after the latter half of the 20th century.

Results

Results by county

References

1964
Arizona
1964 Arizona elections